Riverhead is a community in the Canadian province of Nova Scotia, located in the Municipality of the District of Barrington of Shelburne County.

See also
 List of communities in Nova Scotia

References

Communities in Shelburne County, Nova Scotia
General Service Areas in Nova Scotia